Dexiomimops is a genus of flies in the family Tachinidae.

Species
Dexiomimops brevipes Shima, 1987
Dexiomimops crassipes Shima, 1987
Dexiomimops curtipes Shima, 1987
Dexiomimops flavipes Shima, 1987
Dexiomimops fuscata Shima & Chao, 1992
Dexiomimops longipes Townsend, 1926
Dexiomimops rufipes Baranov, 1935

References

Diptera of Asia
Dexiinae
Tachinidae genera
Taxa named by Charles Henry Tyler Townsend